Complete results for the Women's Slalom competition at the 2009 World Championships.  It was run on February 15, the final race of the championships.

101 athletes from 42 countries competed.

Results

References

Women's slalom
2009 in French women's sport
FIS